The Norm Fieldgate Trophy is a Canadian Football League trophy awarded to the outstanding defensive player in the West Division. Each team in the West division nominates a player, from which the winner is chosen.  Either the winner of this trophy or the winner of the James P. McCaffrey Trophy will also be the winner of the Canadian Football League Most Outstanding Defensive Player award. The trophy is named after former BC Lions linebacker Norm Fieldgate.

As part of the failed American expansion, the Fieldgate trophy was awarded in 1995 to the North Division's outstanding defensive player.

Prior to 1974 the CFL's Most Outstanding Lineman Award was awarded to both outstanding defensive players and outstanding linemen in the West Division.

Norm Fieldgate Trophy winners

 1974 - John Helton (DT), Calgary Stampeders
 1975 - Bill Baker (DE), BC Lions
 1976 - Bill Baker (DE), BC Lions
 1977 - Danny Kepley (LB), Edmonton Eskimos
 1978 - Dave Fennell, (DT), Edmonton Eskimos
 1979 - John Helton (DT), Winnipeg Blue Bombers
 1980 - Danny Kepley (LB), Edmonton Eskimos
 1981 - Danny Kepley (LB), Edmonton Eskimos
 1982 - James "Quick" Parker (LB), Edmonton Eskimos
 1983 - Danny Bass (LB), Calgary Stampeders
 1984 - James "Quick" Parker (DE), BC Lions
 1985 - Tyrone Jones (LB), Winnipeg Blue Bombers
 1986 - James "Quick" Parker (DE), BC Lions
 1987 - Greg Stumon (DE), BC Lions
 1988 - Danny Bass (LB), Edmonton Eskimos
 1989 - Danny Bass (LB), Edmonton Eskimos
 1990 - Stewart Hill (DE), Edmonton Eskimos
 1991 - Will Johnson (DE), Calgary Stampeders
 1992 - Willie Pless (LB), Edmonton Eskimos
 1993 - Jearld Baylis (DT), Saskatchewan Roughriders
 1994 - Willie Pless (LB), Edmonton Eskimos
 1995 - Willie Pless (LB), Edmonton Eskimos
 1996 - Willie Pless (LB), Edmonton Eskimos
 1997 - Willie Pless (LB), Edmonton Eskimos
 1998 - Alondra Johnson (LB), Calgary Stampeders
 1999 - Daved Benefield (DE), BC Lions
 2000 - Terry Ray (LB), Edmonton Eskimos
 2001 - Barrin Simpson (LB), BC Lions
 2002 - Elfrid Payton (DE), Edmonton Eskimos
 2003 - Joe Fleming (DT), Calgary Stampeders
 2004 - John Grace (LB), Calgary Stampeders
 2005 - John Grace (LB), Calgary Stampeders
 2006 - Brent Johnson (DE), BC Lions
 2007 - Cameron Wake (DE), BC Lions
 2008 - Cameron Wake (DE), BC Lions
 2009 - John Chick (DT), Saskatchewan Roughriders
 2010 - Juwan Simpson (LB), Calgary Stampeders
 2011 - Jerrell Freeman (LB), Saskatchewan Roughriders
 2012 - J. C. Sherritt (LB), Edmonton Eskimos
 2013 - Charleston Hughes (LB), Calgary Stampeders
 2014 - Solomon Elimimian (LB), BC Lions
 2015 - Adam Bighill (LB), BC Lions
 2016 - Solomon Elimimian (LB), BC Lions
 2017 - Alex Singleton (LB), Calgary Stampeders
 2018 - Adam Bighill (LB), Winnipeg Blue Bombers
 2019 - Willie Jefferson (DE), Winnipeg Blue Bombers
 2020 – season cancelled - covid 19
 2021 – Adam Bighill (LB), Winnipeg Blue Bombers
 2022 – Shawn Lemon (DE), Calgary Stampeders

CFL's Most Outstanding Lineman Award in the West Division prior to the 1974

1957 - Art Walker (OT/DG), Edmonton Eskimos
1958 - Don Luzzi (DT), Calgary Stampeders
1959 - Roger Nelson (OT), Edmonton Eskimos
1960 - Herb Gray (DE), Winnipeg Blue Bombers
1961 - Frank Rigney (OT), Winnipeg Blue Bombers
1962 - Wayne Harris (LB), Calgary Stampeders
1963 - Tom Brown (LB), British Columbia Lions
1964 - Tom Brown (LB), British Columbia Lions

1965 - Wayne Harris (LB), Calgary Stampeders
1966 - Wayne Harris (LB), Calgary Stampeders
1967 - Ed McQuarters (DT), Saskatchewan Roughriders
1968 - Ted Urness (C), Saskatchewan Roughriders
1969 - John LaGrone (DT), Edmonton Eskimos
1970 - Wayne Harris (LB), Calgary Stampeders
1971 - Wayne Harris (LB), Calgary Stampeders
1972 - John Helton (DT), Calgary Stampeders
1973 - Ray Nettles (LB), British Columbia Lions

References
CFL Publications: 2011 Facts, Figures & Records

Canadian Football League trophies and awards